The Lithidiidae are a family of grasshoppers, in the Orthoptera: suborder Caelifera. Species in this family can be found in Africa.

Genera
The Orthoptera Species File lists:
 Eneremius Saussure, 1888
 Lithidiopsis Dirsh, 1956
 Lithidium Uvarov, 1925
 Microtmethis Karny, 1910

References

External links
 
 
 ITIS: Lithidiidae

Caelifera
Orthoptera families